This is a list of seasons completed by the San Diego State Aztecs men's college basketball team.

Seasons

 
 
 
 

 

 
 
 

 
 
 
 
 
 

 
 
 
 
 
 
 
 
 
 
 
 

 

 
 
 
 
 

 
 
 
 

 

 
 
 
 
 
 
 
 

 
 
 
 
 

 
 

 
 
 
 
 

 Tom McMullen coached the first 7 games of the 1928–29 season before being replaced by Morris Gross.
 DeLauer and Mitchell were co-head coaches.
 Jim Harrick Jr. coached the final 7 games of 1991–92 season.

References

 
San Diego State Aztecs
San Diego State Aztecs basketball seasons
San Diego State Aztecs basketball seasons